Dyschiriognatha is a genus of long-jawed orb-weavers that was first described by Eugène Louis Simon in 1893.

Species
 it contains four species, found in Oceania, Asia, and Brazil:
Dyschiriognatha bedoti Simon, 1893 (type) – Borneo
Dyschiriognatha lobata Vellard, 1926 – Brazil
Dyschiriognatha oceanica Berland, 1929 – Samoa
Dyschiriognatha upoluensis Marples, 1955 – Samoa, Niue, Cook Is. (Aitutaki), Society Is.

See also
 List of Tetragnathidae species

References

Araneomorphae genera
Spiders of Brazil
Spiders of the Indian subcontinent
Spiders of Oceania
Tetragnathidae